Mathurin de Chacus (born 9 November 1958), is a football administrator from Benin who is a member of the FIFA Council since 2021. He was elected president of the Benin Football Federation in 2018.

References

1958 births
Living people
FIFA officials
Beninese sports executives and administrators